The Mercedes-Benz OM648 engine is a 3.2 Litre, straight-6 4 valves per cylinder, cast iron block diesel engine manufactured by the Mercedes-Benz division of Daimler AG as a replacement for the previous Mercedes-Benz inline-5 and -6 engines.

The engine features common rail fuel injection and a variable nozzle turbocharger.

All while managing + city and + Highway

Oil specification MB 229.31 or MB 228.31 is recommended  and has a service interval of  using the specified oil.

OM648 is the successor to the OM613.

Technical specifications

References

OM648
Diesel engines by model
Straight-six engines